The Indian Sorcerer is a 1908 French short silent film by Georges Méliès. It was sold by Méliès's Star Film Company and is numbered 1253–1257 in its catalogues.

Plot
In an open space in front of houses built in Moorish style, overlooking palm trees and a body of water, a woman is dusting a painting of a sorcerer in a turban and long robes. Suddenly the sorcerer himself bursts through the painting and indulges in a variety of magic tricks, with the woman looking on and sometimes taking part. First the sorcerer makes an egg appear from her ear; then he makes it grow to enormous size, cuts it neatly in half, and combines the two half-shells with a palm tree and a pair of spectacles to make a giant weighing scale. Putting ingredients into the two half-shells and putting them back together, he cooks the egg over a fire and makes a flock of hens, and then two tiny children, appear from it. For a finale, he makes the woman herself burst from the egg. She takes a bow and exits, and the sorcerer puts one half-shell on his back and crawls happily away.

Production
Méliès himself plays the title role in the film, which uses pyrotechnics and substitution splices to create its special effects.

References

External links
 

French black-and-white films
Films directed by Georges Méliès
French silent short films
1900s French films